The City of Stirling is a local government area in the northern suburbs of the Western Australian capital city of Perth about  north of Perth's central business district.

History
Stirling was established on 24 January 1871 as the Perth Road District under the District Roads Act 1871. The district at that time included what are now the Cities of Wanneroo, Joondalup, Bayswater and Belmont.

With the passage of the Local Government Act 1960, which reformed all road districts into shires, it became the Shire of Perth on 1 July 1961. The Shire of Perth had a population of 84,000 in 1961. It was declared a city and renamed Stirling on 24 January 1971.

At a meeting of electors in May 2021, electors passed a motion that the City of Stirling be renamed, causing it to be considered at the next council meeting. The rationale for the name change is the personal involvement of James Stirling, the first governor of Western Australia and the namesake of the city, in the Pinjarra Massacre on 28 October 1834. Following the well-conceived ambush and subsequent massacre of 15 to 80 Binjareb Noongar men, women, and children lasting at least one hour that Stirling led personally, Stirling threatened the Noongar people with genocide should they continue to resist colonisation. Historian Chris Owen has argued that James Stirling's involvement in the Pinjarra massacre was on the historical record, and "there's no ambiguity in it any more, Stirling set out to punish the Noongar tribe down there for blocking expansion of the colony. He told everyone what he was going to do, went down there, did it and reported on it." 

The motion made national news, and sparked a barrage of hateful messages towards the City of Stirling. Among suggestions was for a dual name to be adopted, involving a Noongar name. A report released by the city two weeks later stated that the name change was not a priority, and that there were significant costs associated with any name change. At the council meeting on 8 June 2021, arguments were put forth either way, with one councillor saying "while nobody condoned historical atrocities, a name change would cost 'millions of dollars', would set a dangerous precedent and should be 'nipped in the bud", but no motions regarding changing the name were carried. The meeting was attended by over 100 people, an unusually high number. Shortly afterwards, Western Australian senators called for a broader review of Western Australian "place names, such as Stirling Range, linked to colonial figures with known racist histories ... such as William Dampier, John Forrest and John Septimus Roe."

Wards
The city has been divided into seven wards, each of two councillors. Each councillor serves a four-year term, and half-elections are held every two years. The mayor is elected from among the councillors.

 Balga Ward
 Coastal Ward
 Doubleview Ward
 Hamersley Ward
 Inglewood Ward
 Lawley Ward
 Osborne Ward

Suburbs
The suburbs of the City of Stirling with population and size figures based on the most recent Australian census:

Population

 The 1996 figure includes 9,703 residents living in Maylands, and Mount Lawley south of the Midland railway line who were transferred to the City of Bayswater in 1998.

Libraries
The City of Stirling holds 6 libraries. They are the:
 Scarborough Library
 Karrinyup Library
 Dianella Library
 Inglewood Library
 Mirrabooka Library
 Osborne Library

Heritage-listed places

As of 2023, 641 places are heritage-listed in the City of Stirling, of which 20 are on the State Register of Heritage Places.

See also
 List of mayors of Stirling

References

External links
 

 
Stirling
Naming controversies